The OpenCD project is a discontinued open-source project aimed to introduce users of Microsoft Windows to the benefits of free and open-source software (FOSS). It is a CD image that can freely be downloaded and copied. The OpenCD team screened programs for stability, quality, and ease of installation, and only distributed programs available under an OSI-approved open-source license, which allows users to freely use and distribute the disc as they wish. It was sponsored by Canonical Ltd., for a period.

The project was started in April 2002 in response to an article on linux.com by astrophysics student Henrik Nilsen Omma.

In September 2007, project lead Chris Gray left the project to pursue his own open-source disc, called OpenDisc, citing numerous difficulties which he believed were negatively affecting the progress of the OpenCD project. As of September 27, 2007, the OpenCD project is no longer under active development.

Version 07.04
Version 07.04 (as the version suggests, released in April 2007) includes the then-latest versions of the following:

 Design: Blender, GIMP, Inkscape, NVU, Scribus, Tux Paint.
 Games: Battle for Wesnoth, Enigma, Neverball, Sokoban YASC
 Internet: Azureus, FileZilla, Firefox, Pidgin, HTTrack, RSSOwl, SeaMonkey, Thunderbird, TightVNC, WinSCP
 Multimedia: Audacity, Celestia, Really Slick Screensavers, Stellarium
 Productivity: MoinMoin, Notepad2, OpenOffice.org, PDFCreator
 Utilities: 7-Zip, Abakt, ClamWin, GTK+, HealthMonitor, Workrave

References

External links
 
 Development blog
 The OpenCD Italian Edition (Italian localized version)
 The OpenCD Hungarian Edition (Hungarian localized version)
 The OpenCD Dutch Edition

Similar projects
 OpenDisc
 TTCS OSSWIN CD
 Vrije Software CD 07.10 (Dutch)
 GNUWin II
 WinLibre,
 Open Source Software CD
 VALO-CD
 LoLiWin (French)
 AccessApps (UK; applications that can be run from a USB stick)
 Chantra (Thai).
 Das Opensource-DVD Projekt (German)
 The teacher's cdtoolbox / La boîte à outil du prof (English and French)
 Cdlibre (Spanish)
 CyanPack (Brazilian)

Free software distributions
Discontinued software
Projects established in 2002
Projects disestablished in 2007

ro:OpenCD